Hartley House, formerly known as Hartley House Settlement, is a New York not for profit corporation, operating since 1897 as a charity serving the Hell's Kitchen community of Manhattan, New York.  From the day of its founding, the Hartley House has been operating from 413 West 46th Street in Manhattan.

Hartley Farms 
The Hartley Farms are affiliated with the Hartley House Settlement.

Leadership 
 May Mathews was Executive Director of Hartley House for 50 years, beginning in the early 1900s following her graduation from Wellesley.  Her dedication was commemorated by the naming of a neighborhood playground in her honor.
 Grace Hartley Jenkins Mead (1896–1991) was president of Hartley House from 1940 to 1965; she was the great granddaughter of Robert Milham Hartley

Other settlement houses in New York City 
 Lincoln House Settlement – 202 W 63rd Street, Manhattan; founded by the leaders of the Henry Street Settlement to serve New York's African American community
 Henry Street Settlement – Lower East Side, Manhattan; founded in 1893 by Lillian Wald
 Third Street Settlement – 235 E 11th Street, now called Third Street Music School Settlement; founded in 1894 by Emilie Wagner
 Lenox Hill Neighborhood House – 331 E 70th Street; founded in 1894 by the Alumnae Association of Hunter College 
 University Settlement House – the oldest settlement house in the United States, founded in 1886 by Stanton Coit, Charles B. Stover, and Carl Schurz
 Union Settlement Association – founded in 1895 by alumni, faculty, and students of Union Theological Seminary at 202 E 69th Street in response to the desperate conditions of immigrants struggling to make a new life in America ... within five months, the agency moved to its present site at 237 E 104th Street

See also 
 Settlement movement

References

External links 
 Hartley Farms
 United Neighborhood Houses of New York
 Finding aid for the Hartley House records in the Social Welfare History Archives, University of Minnesota Libraries.

Charities based in New York City